William Saumarez Smith (known as Saumarez; 14 January 1836 – 18 April 1909) was an Anglican Archbishop of Sydney, Australia.

Life
Smith was born in Saint Helier, Jersey the eldest twin son of the Lieutenant Richard Snowden Smith (later a clergyman) and his wife Anne, née Robin. Smith was educated at Windlesham House School, Marlborough College and Trinity College, Cambridge, where he graduated B.A. with first-class honours in classics and theology in 1858. He was Crosse theological scholar in 1859, Tyrwhitt Hebrew scholar in 1860, and on two occasions won the Seatonian prize for poetry. He graduated M.A. in 1862, B.D. in 1871, D.D. in 1889, and was a fellow of Trinity College, 1860-70.

Smith was ordained a deacon on 19 June 1859 and priest on 3 Jun 1860; he was vicar of Trumpington, 1867–69, and principal of St Aidan's Theological College, 1869-90. He was consecrated bishop of Sydney and Primate of Australia at St Paul's Cathedral, London, on 24 June 1890, and became archbishop in 1897. At Sydney his episcopate was notable mainly for a great increase in missionary work, and the home mission fund was also established. There was some advance in education; Moore Theological College was reopened, and the Church of England Grammar School For Girls was established in his period. Smith was always accessible to his clergy and always glad to keep in touch with his parishes. Though an extreme evangelical he was broadminded and an advocate for the union of the churches; and though essentially a man of peace, he spoke strongly against gambling and other evils. Smith had a dislike of ceremonial, a passion for accuracy, and was a fine scholar and linguist, interested also in astronomy and botany.

Smith died of cerebral haemorrhage at Sydney on 18 April 1909; he married in 1870 Florence, daughter of the Rev. Lewis Deedes, who died in 1890, and was survived by a son and seven daughters.

Smith was the author of The Bible, its Construction, Character and Claims (1865), 'Capernaum, A Seatonian Poem' (1865), Obstacles to Missionary Success (1868), 'The Disciples, a Seatonian Poem' (1869), Christian Faith, Five Sermons (1869), Lessons on Genesis (1879), The Blood of the New Testament (1889). In 1911 his verses were collected and published posthumously under the title, Capernaum and Other Poems.

References

External links

 Capernaum and Other Poems, a digitized copy of the first edition from Internet Archive.

1836 births
1909 deaths
Anglican archbishops of Sydney
Primates of the Anglican Church of Australia
Jersey academics
Jersey Anglicans
Alumni of Trinity College, Cambridge
Anglican bishops of Sydney
People from Saint Helier
Jersey emigrants to Australia
People educated at Windlesham House School